Anke Katrin Eißmann (born 1977 in Dillenburg) is a German illustrator and graphic designer known for her illustrations of J. R. R. Tolkien's legendarium. She studied visual communication at Bauhaus University in Weimar and at the Colchester Institute in the United Kingdom. Eißmann has also made a number of short films. She is an art teacher at the Johanneum high school in Herborn.

Works
Eißmann's early inspiration was drawn from works by J. R. R. Tolkien, such as The Silmarillion and The Lord of the Rings. In a 2009 interview she stated that her first encounter with Tolkien's theme was watching Ralph Bakshi's animated film version of Lord of the Rings in 1991. This inspired her to read the novel and initially made her draw illustrations. While studying in Weimar, she began to publish her illustrations on the internet, which gave her feedback by such artists as Ted Nasmith. As stated on her homepage, Eißmann was also influenced by: "the Pre-Raphaelites, book-illustrators like Arthur Rackham, Edmond Dulac, Ivan Bilibin and Alan Lee, Art Nouveau, artists like Edward Hopper and Jan Vermeer".

Apart from Tolkien themes, a lot of Eißmann's work is focused on mythological and historical themes. Other inspirations include the BBC television series Sherlock.

Illustrations
Books and other writings illustrated by Anke Eißmann include:

The Rejected Quarterly (Winter/spring 2004), a literary magazine sold in universities at the west coast of the United States, focusing on fictional works rejected by other publishers.

Beowulf and the Dragon, Walking Tree Publishers (2009),  (the dragon episode of Beowulf, Old English text with the translation by John Porter, foreword by Tom Shippey)

See also
Works inspired by J. R. R. Tolkien
Faramir, featuring artwork by A. Eißmann

References

External links
Official site
Anke Eißmann on Elfwood

1977 births
Living people
German illustrators
Tolkien artists